Katherine von Drachenberg (born March 8, 1982), known professionally as Kat Von D, is a Mexican-born American tattoo artist, model, entrepreneur and recording artist. She is best known for her work as a tattoo artist on the TLC reality television show LA Ink, which premiered in the United States on August 7, 2007, and ran for four seasons. She is also known for being the former head of Kat Von D Beauty (renamed KVD Vegan Beauty). In May 2021, Kat Von D released her first single "Exorcism" from her album Love Made Me Do It.

Early life 
Katherine von Drachenberg was born in Montemorelos, Nuevo León, Mexico. Her parents, René and Sylvia, both of whom were missionaries for the Seventh-day Adventist Church, were born in Argentina, and are respectively of German, Italian, Spanish, and Indigenous descent. Von D has a sister, Karoline and a brother, Michael. She moved with her family to the Inland Empire at age four and grew up in Colton, California. Von D was classically trained in piano beginning at age six.

Von D credits her grandmother, Clara von Drachenberg, as an inspiration for her in music and art, and the culture of San Bernardino County as a major influence on her tattoo art and style. She began listening to the Ramones, Misfits, and other punk rock bands at the age of 12. She got her first tattoo at 14 and quit school at 16 to become a tattoo artist.

When she was 15, Von D was sent to Provo Canyon School for six months, a notorious facility of the troubled teen industry, where she says she suffered abuse. Provo Canyon School is the same boarding school that Paris Hilton attended; Hilton has also alleged that she was abused while attending this school.

Career 

Von D appeared in two seasons of Miami Ink, the reality TV show taped at 305 Ink in Miami for the cable network TLC. She was offered the place on the show after fellow artist Darren Brass broke his elbow, preventing him from tattooing. While on the show, she had a falling out with Ami James, which led to her decision to leave the shop and the show.

She subsequently acquired her own TLC series, LA Ink, which chronicled her work at her tattoo shop, High Voltage Tattoo, in Hollywood, California. On the show, she broke the Guinness World Record of most tattoos given by a single person in 24 hours, with a total of 400. Accomplished in December 2007, it involved a Von D-designed logo for the city of Los Angeles, with proceeds going to the children's-blindness charity Vitamin Angels.  LA Ink ran four seasons, ending September 15, 2011; TLC announced the cancellation on August 18, 2011. Von D has publicly said that the cancellation was because she chose not to continue doing the show.

Her first book, High Voltage Tattoo, compiling her artworks and tattoos, with a foreword by Mötley Crüe's Nikki Sixx, was released in January 2009 and reached #6 on The New York Times Best Seller list. Von D described the book as "not an autobiography, you know, 'cause I'm too young to do that. But this is just kind of like a picture-driven outline of my career as an artist. So, you see everything from my drawings when I was six to tattoos that have never before been seen." Her second book, The Tattoo Chronicles, an illustrated diary following a year in her life, was released October 26, 2010, and reached #3 on The New York Times "Hardcover Advice & Misc." best-seller list.

In 2008, Von D created and launched a make-up line for Sephora. She has released new collections every year and has expanded her line to include fragrances. In 2012, through Sephora, her New American Beauty Art Tour benefitted the Art of Elysium charitable organization. In June 2016, she announced that all products in the line would be reformulated to be vegan. In August 2016, the line released a limited-edition lipstick named Project Chimps, with 20% of sales being donated to Project Chimps, an organization dedicated to providing care for retired research chimpanzees.

Her makeup line received controversy after the release of a lipstick called "Selektion," because the word is considered controversial and inappropriate in the word's native Germany, where it was a term used for Nazis who decided which individuals would be chosen to either be put to work or death upon arrival to concentration camps during World War II. The fallout led to the lipstick being renamed "Beloved". The choice of "Selektion" drew attention to other perceived insensitive acts; The Forward called her "anti-Jew." Von D fell under criticism again when she named a lipstick "Celebutard", Sephora quickly pulled the lipstick from their stores and issued an apology.

Von D is the creator of the MusInk Tattoo Convention and Music Festival, which began in 2008. Musink is an all ages tattoo, music, and art festival located in Southern California.

On September 2, 2010, Von D opened the art gallery and boutique Wonderland Gallery in the space next door to High Voltage Tattoo. She launched the clothing lines KVD Los Angeles and Kat Von D Los Angeles in the US and Canada in fall 2011, with the latter expanding internationally the following year.

Von D provided the female vocals to the song "Rosary Blue" on X, a 2012 studio album by the Finnish gothic rock band The 69 Eyes. In August 2013, she tweeted that Dave Grohl and producer Danny Lohner had finished two tracks of an album she had talked about recording as early as 2011.

In 2016 she recorded vocals for the electronic music duo, Prayers, on the song "Black Leather", and appeared in the band's video for the song.

In 2018, she collaborated with Rooney Mara, Sia, Sadie Sink and Joaquin Phoenix to narrate Chris Delforce's animal rights documentary Dominion. For her contribution to the documentary, she was granted the 2018 Award of Excellence for Narration by Hollywood International Independent Documentary Awards.
Von D makes guest appearance on three songs on the 2018 album Alive in New Light by IAMX. She also appeared on synthwave band Gunship album Dark All Day in the song "Black Blood, Red Kiss".

On January 16, 2020, Von D announced she had sold her namesake beauty brand to its parent company, Kendo Brands (a subsidiary of LVMH). The brand will be rebranded as "KVD Vegan Beauty". According to the company the letters KVD now stand for "Kindness, Vegan Beauty, and Discovery (and Doing Good)". This was followed by another rebrand on Tuesday 2 March 2021 to "KVD Beauty" where KVD stands for "Kara", "Veritas", "Decora". This translates to "Value", "Truth" and "Beauty" respectively.

In October 2021, she announced that she would be closing High Voltage on December 1 and moving with her family to Indiana.

Personal life 
In July 2007, Von D decided to stop drinking after her usage of alcohol started to threaten her work. Von D recalled that "getting sober was not easy for me....I still clearly remember the physical pain from withdrawals, the profound desire to die, and the overwhelming sense of loneliness I felt that day that I decided to quit."

Von D has tattooed herself with the emblems of the bands HIM, Misfits, Turbonegro, ZZ Top, Guns N' Roses, AC/DC, Kent, Slayer, Mike Got Spiked and "Slutallica", a modified Metallica logo. She appeared in the music video of HIM's "Killing Loneliness", Alkaline Trio's "Help Me", GUNSHIP's "Black Blood Red Kiss", and "Black Leather" by Cholo Goth band Prayers. Other musical artists that Von D lists among her favorites include Lemmy Kilmister, The Mars Volta and Selena.

Von D was vegan, and her former makeup line is vegan and cruelty-free. In 2016, she received Farm Sanctuary's "Compassion in Action Award" for her work on behalf of animal rights.

Von D sparked controversy in June 2018, when she indicated in an Instagram post that she would refuse to vaccinate her future child and would also raise her child on a vegan diet. In March 2020, she recanted those claims, saying she had made a mistake, was "completely uninformed" about vaccinations, and that she is "not an anti-vaxxer at all".

Von D divides her time between Windsor Square, Los Angeles and Vevay, Indiana.

Relationships 
Von D married fellow tattoo artist Oliver Peck in 2003. They separated in August 2007, and finalized their divorce later that year.

Von D then dated Alex "Orbi" Orbison from 2007 to early 2008, as was documented on the first season of LA Ink. Von D and Orbison move in together in the episode "Kat Cleans Up", and in the last episode of the season, titled "Orbi's Secret", Orbison asks Von D's father for permission to marry her. By the first episode of Season 2, their relationship was over.

From February 2008 until January 2010, Von D dated Mötley Crüe bassist Nikki Sixx.

She subsequently began dating motorcycle customizer, West Coast Choppers CEO, and reality TV personality Jesse James. On August 19, 2010, Von D confirmed media reports that she and James were dating, tweeting, "I think it's pretty obvious that we're dating." Von D and James became engaged in January 2011. Von D announced that they had split in July 2011. However, in August 2011, Von D and James announced that their engagement was back on. In September 2011, Von D announced that she and James had broken up again.

In September 2012, Von D began dating Canadian music producer Joel Zimmerman, known professionally as Deadmau5, and gave him a star tattoo below his eye to match her own. They broke up in November 2012. However, on December 15, 2012, Zimmerman proposed to Von D over Twitter, and she accepted, becoming engaged to him. In June 2013, Von D announced that she and Zimmerman had ended their engagement. Von D cited Zimmerman's alleged infidelity as the reason, which Zimmerman has denied.

On February 21, 2018, Von D married artist Rafael Reyes. In November 2018, she gave birth to their son, Leafar Von D Reyes.

Media 
Von D is referenced in the Eagles of Death Metal song "High Voltage", which was named after her shop and is featured on the band's third album, Heart On. In an interview, Eagles of Death Metal's Jesse Hughes said, "I wrote that for Kat Von D, because that girl's bad ass."

Selected filmography 
In addition to cameo and talk-show appearances, Von D's television, film, and video game appearances include:

Discography

Studio albums

EPs

Singles

Other releases

References

External links 

 
 
  Includes samples of her artwork.
 

1982 births
Living people
People from Colton, California
People from Montemorelos, Nuevo León
American tattoo artists
Participants in American reality television series
American female models
Mexican female models
American people of German descent
American people of Italian descent
American people of Spanish descent
American people of Argentine descent
American people of Mexican descent
Mexican people of Argentine descent
Mexican people of Italian descent
Mexican people of German descent
Mexican people of Spanish descent
Mexican emigrants to the United States
Former Seventh-day Adventists
American cosmetics businesspeople
American veganism activists
Mexican women activists
Activists from California
Hispanic and Latino American female models